There have been three baronetcies created for persons with the surname Nicholson, all in the Baronetage of the United Kingdom. See also Nicolson baronets.

The Nicholson Baronetcy, of Luddenham in New South Wales, was created in the Baronetage of the United Kingdom on 8 April 1859 for Charles Nicholson, the first Speaker of the New South Wales Legislative Council. His eldest son, the second Baronet, became a well-known ecclesiastical architect. The title became extinct on the death of the third Baronet in 1986. Archibald Keightley Nicholson and Sir Sydney Nicholson, younger sons of the first Baronet, also gained distinction.

The Nicholson Baronetcy, of Harrington Gardens in the Royal Borough of Kensington, was created in the Baronetage of the United Kingdom on 7 February 1912 for Charles Norris Nicholson, Liberal Member of Parliament for Doncaster between 1906 and 1918. His grandson, the second Baronet, was Chairman of the Ocean Steamship Company and of Martins Bank and also served as Lord-Lieutenant of the Isle of Wight from 1980 to 1986. The title is now held by the latter's son, the third Baronet, who succeeded in 1993.

The Nicholson Baronetcy, of Winterbourne in the Royal County of Berkshire, was created in the Baronetage of the United Kingdom on 21 March 1958 for the Conservative politician Godfrey Nicholson. He had four daughters but no sons and the baronetcy consequently became extinct on his death in 1991. His third daughter is the life peer Emma Nicholson, Baroness Nicholson of Winterbourne.

Nicholson baronets, of Luddenham (1859)

Sir Charles Nicholson, 1st Baronet (1808–1903)
Sir Charles Archibald Nicholson, 2nd Baronet (1867–1949)
Sir John Charles Nicholson, 3rd Baronet (1904–1986)

Nicholson baronets, of Harrington Gardens, Kensington (1912)

Sir Charles Norris Nicholson, 1st Baronet (1857–1918) MP for Doncaster 1906–1918
Sir John Norris Nicholson, 2nd Baronet (1911–1993) Lord Lieutenant Isle of Wight 1980–
Sir Charles Christian Nicholson, 3rd Baronet (born 1941)

Nicholson baronets, of Winterbourne (1958)
Sir Godfrey Nicholson, 1st Baronet (1901–1991)

See also
Nicolson baronets

Notes

References
Kidd, Charles, Williamson, David (editors). Debrett's Peerage and Baronetage (1990 edition). New York: St Martin's Press, 1990, 

Baronetcies in the Baronetage of the United Kingdom
Extinct baronetcies in the Baronetage of the United Kingdom